This is a list of media in Saguenay, Quebec.

Radio

Television

Print

The city's main daily newspaper is Le Quotidien. Le Journal de Québec also publishes a special edition for the Saguenay–Lac-Saint-Jean region. Other newspapers now or formerly published in the city include Le Réveil, as well as student newspapers published at the city's colleges and at the Université du Québec à Chicoutimi.

References

Saguenay
 
Media, Saguenay